Zanaga is a town and capital of Zanaga District in the Lékoumou Department of northeastern Republic of the Congo.

It lies near the Ogooue River, which flows north into Gabon.

Mining 
The city is near Zanaga mine, a potential 3 billion tonne iron ore deposit.

Transport 
The city is served by Zanaga Airport.

See also 
 Iron ore in Africa
 Railway stations in Congo

References 

Lékoumou Department
Populated places in the Republic of the Congo